Outback Truckers is an Australian factual television series which looks at the Australian road-transport industry. It focuses on selected drivers and interesting personalities and shows the problems tackled by some sectors. The show is filmed mostly across Australia, but also takes detour in New Zealand (seasons 3–5) and Weno, Micronesia (season 4). It originally screened on the Seven Network in 2012 and currently airs on 7mate.  It has aired around the world on networks such as Quest TV (UK) and Discovery Europe. Season 8 is airing in Australia in May 2020.

Cast 
 Amanda Kendall – Kendall Trucking & Co, Katanning, WA, oversize pilot (Season 2–5)
 Athol Martin- Mactrans heavy haulage, WA, oversize (season 8)
 Anthony Haigh – Murranji Water Drilling (Season 6, 7)
 Anthony 'Hayesy' Hayes – Murranji Water Drilling (Season 6, 7)
 Ashleigh Mackay – Mackay & Sons House Removals & Demolition, Narangba, Queensland (Season 6, 7)
 Belinda Riehl (Season 3)
 Bob Fraser (Season 3)
 Brad Duckworth – Black Cat Civil Contractors, Nambour, Queensland (Season 5)
 Brett Robin (Season 2)
 Carl Andrews (Season 3)
 Chris Ferris (Season 3)
Chris Parnell – Non-trucking oversize steerer and rearguard guide, Rex J Andrews Pty Ltd., Windfarm transporter, Newcastle, NSW (Season 4–6)
 Christian Reynolds (Season 2)
 Clare Bolitho (Season 1–2)
 Corey Chapman (Season 2)
 Craig Oldham (Season 7)
 Damo Callan (Season 1) 
 Danyelle Haigh, Murranji Water Drilling
 Darrell Wright (Season 3)
 Darren 'Woody' Bryant (Season 4-7)
 Dave "Macka" McCready (Season 2–3)
 Deb Drew (Season 1)
 Dion Fisher (Season 2)
 Dougal Brett (Season 1)
 Emily Brett (Season 1)
 Ewan Stephens (Season 2–3)
 Glen Waters (Season 2)
 Glenn "Yogi" Kendall, Kendall Trucking, Katanning, WA (Season 2–5)
 Gordo Evans (Season 1–2)
 Graham Cockerell - Need for Feed Disaster Relief, Beaconsfield Upper, Victoria (Season 2)
 Greg Wise (Season 3)
 Heather Jones (Season 2)
 Jared Baldwin (Season 3)
 Jason Ackeroyd (Season 3)
 Jeff Elliot (Season 5 )
 Jeff "Bluezy" Barrow (Season 2) (He died due to truck crash)
 Joanna Atkins – North Kimberley Transport, Kununurra, WA (Season 6, 7)
 Joey Granich (Season 2)
 John Harrison (Season 7)
 Jonathan Rayner (Season 3)
 Josh Beattie – MB Logistics, Adelaide, SA, Industrial Oil and Gas piping (Season 5)
 Justin Harrison – KAC Enterprise Pty Ltd, Bundaberg, QLD (Season 7)
 Katie Howell (Season 2)
 Kaye Ferris (Season 3)
 Larry Brewer – North West Express Mobile Butcher (Season 3, 7)
 Leanne Brewer – North West Express Mobile Butcher (Season 3, 7)
 Luke Hewitt - Narrator (Season 1-8)
 Mark Bolitho (Season 1–2)
 Mark Cromwell – RJE Global Pty Ltd, Adelaide, SA, Mega-sized trucker (Season 2–5)
 Mark King (Season 1)
 Mark Sciberras – Windfarm transporter, Rex J Andrews Pty Ltd., Newcastle, NSW (Season 4–6)
 Matt Adams (Season 3)
 Matt Riches (Season 1–2)
Mick King (season 5–6)
 Mike Hoath – RJE Global Pty Ltd
 Nick Atkins – North Kimberley Transport, Kununurra, WA (Season 6,7)
 Noelene Turner (Season 2)
 Paul 'Sludge' Andrews – Paul Andrews Transport, Perth, WA, fuel-tanker (Season 3–7)
 Paul 'Blinky' Cunningham – Rex J Andrews Pty Ltd., Windfarm transporter, Newcastle, NSW (Season 4–6)
 Peter "Turbo" Teatoff (Season 2-4, 6)
 Ray Kennedy (Season 7)
 Robbie Mackay – Mackay & Sons House Removals & Demolition, Narangba, Queensland, Australia (Season 5–8)
 Rosco Haining (Season 3)
 Ross Carrigy (Season 7)
 Russell McDonough (Season 2, 5-6)
 Shane Burgess – Mackay & Sons House Removals & Demolition, Narangba, Queensland, Australia (Season 5–8)
 Sharon Collins (Season 2–3)
 Shui Evans (Season 1–2)
 Simon Page (Season 3)
 Sonya Wise (Season 3)
 Steve Grahame – Perth, WA (Seasons 1–8)
 Steve Hughes (Season 1)
 Wayne Haigh, Murranji Water Drilling

Cast updates, losses and notes 
In July 2017 one of the cast members, Sonya Wise, died. Sonya and her husband, Greg, featured in season 3 of Outback Truckers. Outback Truckers Noelene Turner died in 2014. She left behind her outback trucking husband Bluesy. In 2015, season 1 trucker Dougal Brett was killed when the helicopter he was piloting, crashed on his cattle station.

Jeff Elliot from Season 5 is also a well renowned airbrush and abstract artist as well as one of the founding members of the British and European Custom Truck Scene, and won many awards at major shows in the 1980s for his custom fabrication and airbrush skills. Later in the 1980s he concentrated on international truck driving and did many long trips, with destinations as far and wide as Europe, Africa, the Middle East, Russia, and even did regular trips from Italy to the Chinese border at Corgos.  In the late 1990s he moved to Australia and operated a very successful air brush business, but has now returned to full-time truck driving, as well as running Tasmanian Landscape Studio.com  On his debut in season 5, he was a fresh seafood freighter.

Relation to other series 
In season 5, government has released land to Coober Pedy (South Australia) for the mining of opals in 2017, and Mark Cromwell was seen sending mining machinery to the mines. In 2018, it spawned the spinoff series: Outback Opal Hunters.

Reception 
Outback Truckers was favourably reviewed by the press. Melinda Houston from The Sydney Morning Herald's 'Critics Choice' noted that "they're great stories well told from a part of the country and a way of life most of us will never otherwise experience". It was also praised in The West Australian for its various close ties with Western Australia. News Limited's 'Switch On' gave it a 4/5 rating, one of the week's highest scores.

Viewers

Season 1 (2014)

International broadcasting 
The following table lists the countries in which Outback Truckers airs outside Australia.

Episodes

Series overview

Series 1 (2012)

Season 2 (2014)

Season 3 (2015)

Season 4 (2016)

Season 5 (2017)

Season 6 (2018)

Season 7 (2019)

Season 8 (2020)

See also
 List of Australian television series
 Ice Road Truckers

References

External links
 
 Outback Truckers on 7plus

English-language television shows
2010s Australian reality television series
Australian factual television series
7mate original programming
2012 Australian television series debuts
Television shows set in Western Australia
Television shows set in the Outback
2020s Australian reality television series